Boxy is an adjective meaning "like a box". Boxy or alternate spellings may refer to:

Boxy
 Boxy Brown, a character in Aqua Teen Hunger Force
 a character in the novel Boxy an Star
 Boxy, a character in Dark Kingdom
 Boxy, a character in Futurama

Boxee
 Boxee, an HTPC (Home Theater PC) software

Boxi
 Liang Boxi (born 1938), diver
 Boxi (薄奚), a Chinese surname
 BoxI, an enzyme
 BOXI, SAP BusinessObjects XI

Boxey
 Boxey, a child character in the 1978–79 television series Battlestar Galactica
 Boxey, Newfoundland and Labrador, a settlement in Canada

Boxie
 Boxie, a singer signed to Polo Grounds Music and J Records, see List of artists signed to J Records
 Boxie, a singer signed to Channel 7, see List of The Inc. Records artists

Boxxy
 Boxxy (born 1992), YouTube personality